Jacobo Campos Piñeiro (born 15 March 1981 in Vigo, Galicia) is a Spanish former footballer who played mainly as a left midfielder.

Honours
Celta
UEFA Intertoto Cup: 2000

Spain U17
UEFA–CAF Meridian Cup: 1999

External links

Celta de Vigo biography 

1981 births
Living people
Spanish footballers
Footballers from Vigo
Association football midfielders
La Liga players
Segunda División players
Segunda División B players
Tercera División players
Celta de Vigo B players
Pontevedra CF footballers
SD Compostela footballers
RC Celta de Vigo players
CD Leganés players
UD Salamanca players
Real Oviedo players
CF Badalona players
Coruxo FC players
Spain youth international footballers